Tiramin (also Romanized as Tīrāmīn; also known as Tarāmīn and Tūrāmīn) is a village in Shahrak Rural District of Mamqan District, Azarshahr County, East Azerbaijan province, Iran. At the 2006 and 2011 censuses, its population was below the reporting threshold. The latest census in 2016 showed a population of zero, and it was the only village in its rural district.

References 

Azarshahr County

Populated places in East Azerbaijan Province

Populated places in Azarshahr County